Philip Rosenthal (born 1960) is an American television writer and producer.

Philip or Phil Rosenthal may also refer to:

 Phil Rosenthal (columnist) (born 1963), American media columnist
 Phil Rosenthal, a member of the American bluegrass group The Seldom Scene
 Philip Rosenthal (industrialist) (born 1916), German entrepreneur and politician
 Philipp Rosenthal (1855–1937), German entrepreneur